Dark Delusion is a 1947 American drama film directed by Willis Goldbeck and starring James Craig, Lionel Barrymore, and Lucille Bremer. Produced and released by Metro-Goldwyn-Mayer, it was the last film in the Dr. Kildare film series which stretched back to 1937.

Plot
Dr. Gillespie (Barrymore) asks a young surgeon, Dr. Tommy Coalt (Craig), to go to the small town of Bayhurst to replace a local doctor while he is on assignment to the Occupation effort in post-World War II Europe. There, Coalt is asked to sign mental-health commitment papers on a beautiful young socialite, Cynthia Grace (Bremer). Coalt thinks there is something amiss, and begins his own investigation.

Cast
 Lionel Barrymore as Dr. Leonard Gillespie
 James Craig as Dr. Tommy Coalt
 Lucille Bremer as Cynthia Grace
 Jayne Meadows as 	Mrs. Selkirk
 Warner Anderson as Teddy Selkirk
 Henry Stephenson as Dr. Evans Biddle
 Alma Kruger as 	Molly Byrd
 Keye Luke as Dr. Lee Wong How
 Art Baker as 	Dr. Sanford Burson
 Lester Matthews as Wyndham Grace
 Marie Blake as 	Sally
 Ben Lessy as 	Napoleon
 Geraldine Wall as 	Mrs. Rowland
 Nell Craig as 	Nurse 'Nosey' Parker
 George Reed as 	Conover
 Mary Currier as 	Nurse Workman

Reception
According to MGM records, the movie was not a hit, earning $475,000 in the US and Canada and $243,000 elsewhere, making a loss to the studio of $448,000.

References

External links
 Dark Delusion at TCMDB
 
 
 

1947 films
1947 drama films
1940s mystery drama films
American black-and-white films
American mystery drama films
Films directed by Willis Goldbeck
Films set in New York City
Films set in hospitals
Metro-Goldwyn-Mayer films
1940s English-language films
1940s American films